Antim may refer to:

People
 Antim Panghal, Indian wrestler
 Anthim the Iberian, known as Antim Ivireanul in Romanian Language
 Antim, Metropolitan of Belgrade

Others
 Antim Monastery, a Monastery in Romania
 Antim Cup, a Rugby cup, contested between Romania and Georgia, named after Anthim the Iberian
 Antim: The Final Truth, an Indian film